Shuhei Kumura (玖村 修平) is a Japanese kickboxer, fighting out of Tokyo, Japan. He is the current Krush Featherweight (-57.5kg) champion.

As of June 2022, Combat Press ranks him as the fourth best super flyweight kickboxer in the world.

Kickboxing career

NJKF
Kumura made his professional debut at NJKF 2013 5th against Hiroki Matsuoka, winning the fight by unanimous decision. He would go on to amass an 8–3 record, which earned him the chance to fight Koudai Kusaka for the NJKF Bantamweight title. He beat Kusaka by a fourth-round TKO. His last fight with NJKF was at NJKF 2017 west 4th, when he fought Ryo Takahashi. Kumura lost the fight by unanimous decision.

In early 2018, Kumura signed with K-1, and was scheduled to have his organizational debut at Krush 89, when he was scheduled to fight Takaya Ogura. He beat Ogura by majority decision. Kumura next fought Kaito Yamawaki at Krush 92, winning the fight by unanimous decision. Making the transition from Krush to K-1, Kumura fought a no-contest due to doctor stoppage against Yuta Hayashi and lost an extra round decision against Akihiro Kaneko.

Kumura participated in the 2019 K-1 Super Bantamweight Grand Prix. He defeated Sadegh Hashemi by TKO, after knocking the Iranian down twice in the third round. He lost the semifinal bout to the eventual tournament winner Yoshiki Takei by way of TKO, as he was knocked down twice in the first round.

Kumura lost his next fight against Taito Gunji by unanimous decision, but was nonetheless given a place in the Krush Super Bantamweight tournament. He beat Hideki in the quarterfinals by way of a third-round knockout. Advancing to the semifinal, he fought Takahito Niimi. Niimi won the fight by unanimous decision.

He was next scheduled to fight at K'Festa 4. He won a unanimous decision against Takahiro at K-1 World GP 2021: K’Festa 4 Day.2.

Kumura was scheduled to fight Tatsuya Tsubakihara in a non-title bout at K-1 World GP 2021: Japan Bantamweight Tournament. Tsubakihara won the fight by unanimous decision.

Kumura was scheduled to face Kizaemon Saiga at K-1 World GP 2021 in Osaka on December 4, 2021. He won the fight by a first-round knockout, stopping Saiga after just 67 seconds.

Kumura was scheduled to face Kaito Ozawa at K-1 World GP 2022 Japan on February 27, 2022. He won the fight by unanimous decision, with all three judges scoring the bout 30–29 in his favor.

Krush featherweight champion
Kumura was rewarded for this two-fight winning streak with the opportunity to challenge the reigning Krush Featherweight champion Takahito Niimi at Krush 137 on May 21, 2022. He won the fight by unanimous decision, with all three judges scoring the bout 30–29 in his favor.

Kumura faced the 2019 K-1 Featherweight World Grand Prix finalist Jawsuayai Sor.Dechaphan at K-1 World GP 2022 in Fukuoka on August 11, 2022, in the quarterfinals of the 2022 K-1 featherweight World Grand Prix. He won the fight by a second-round technical knockout. Kumura had a great start to the fight, as he knocked Jawsuayai with a high kick near the end of the opening round. He knocked his opponent down twice more in the following round, first with a jab counter to a lead leg kick and then with a flurry of punches, with resulted in a stoppage victory for him under the tournament rules. Kumura faced the incumbent K-1 featherweight champion Taito Gunji in the next round of the one-day tournament. He lost the fight by a first-round knockout.

Kumura faced the 2022 K-1 Featherweight World Grand Prix runner-up Toma Tanabe at K-1 World GP 2022 in Osaka on December 3, 2022. He lost the fight by unanimous decision, with scores of 30–25, 30–25 and 30–26, after being knocked down twice in the first two rounds.

Kumura made his first Krush Featherweight (-57.5kg) title defense against Riku Morisaka at Krush 147 on March 25, 2023.

Titles and accomplishments
New Japan Kickboxing Federation
 2017 NJKF Bantamweight Champion

Krush
 2022 Krush Featherweight (-57.5kg) Champion

Fight record

|-  style="text-align:center; background:#;"
| 2023-03-25 || ||align=left| Riku Morisaka || Krush 147 || Tokyo, Japan || ||  ||
|-
! style=background:white colspan=9 |
|-  style="background:#fbb"
| 2022-12-03|| Loss ||align=left| Toma ||  K-1 World GP 2022 in Osaka || Osaka, Japan || Decision (Unanimous) || 3 || 3:00 

|-  style="background:#fbb"
| 2022-08-11|| Loss ||align=left| Taito Gunji ||  K-1 World GP 2022 in Fukuoka, Tournament Semifinals || Fukuoka, Japan || TKO (2 knockdowns/Punches) || 1 || 3:00
|-  style="background:#cfc"
| 2022-08-11|| Win||align=left| Jawsuayai Sor.Dechaphan ||  K-1 World GP 2022 in Fukuoka, Tournament Quarterfinals || Fukuoka, Japan || TKO (2 knockdowns)|| 2 ||1:03
|-
|-  style="text-align:center; background:#cfc;"
| 2022-05-21|| Win ||align=left| Takahito Niimi|| Krush 137 || Tokyo, Japan || Decision (Unanimous)|| 3 ||3:00 
|-
! style=background:white colspan=9 |
|- style="background:#cfc"
| 2022-02-27|| Win ||align=left| Kaito Ozawa ||  K-1 World GP 2022 Japan || Tokyo, Japan || Decision (Unanimous)  || 3 || 3:00  
|-
|-  style="text-align:center; background:#cfc"
| 2021-12-04 || Win || align=left| Kizaemon Saiga|| K-1 World GP 2021 in Osaka || Osaka, Japan || KO (Right Cross)|| 1 ||1:07
|-  style="text-align:center; background:#fbb;"
| 2021-05-23|| Loss || align=left| Tatsuya Tsubakihara || K-1 World GP 2021: Japan Bantamweight Tournament || Tokyo, Japan || Decision (Unanimous) || 3 || 3:00
|-  style="text-align:center; background:#cfc;"
| 2021-03-28|| Win ||align=left| Takahiro || K-1 World GP 2021: K’Festa 4 Day.2 || Yoyogi, Japan || Decision (Unanimous) || 3 || 3:00
|-  style="text-align:center; background:#fbb;"
| 2020-11-27|| Loss || align=left| Takahito Niimi || Krush 119, -57 kg Championship Tournament Semi Finals || Tokyo, Japan || Decision (Unanimous) ||  3|| 3:00
|-  style="text-align:center; background:#cfc;"
| 2020-09-26|| Win ||align=left| Hideki || Krush.117, -57 kg Championship Tournament Quarter Finals || Tokyo, Japan || KO (Straight Right) || 3 || 0:40
|-  style="text-align:center; background:#FFBBBB;"
| 2019-10-13|| Loss ||align=left| Taito Gunji || Krush.106 || Tokyo, Japan || Decision (Unanimous) || 3 || 3:00
|-  style="text-align:center; background:#FFBBBB;"
| 2019-06-30|| Loss ||align=left| Yoshiki Takei || K-1 World GP 2019: Super Bantamweight World Tournament, Semi Finals || Saitama, Japan || TKO (2 Knockdowns/punches) || 1 || 1:46
|-  style="text-align:center; background:#CCFFCC;"
| 2019-06-30|| Win ||align=left| Sadegh Hashemi || K-1 World GP 2019: Super Bantamweight World Tournament, Quarter Finals || Saitama, Japan || TKO (2 knockdowns/punches) || 3 || 2:50
|-  style="text-align:center; background:#FFBBBB;"
| 2019-03-10|| Loss ||align=left| Akihiro Kaneko || K-1 World GP 2019: K’FESTA 2 || Saitama, Japan || Ext.R Decision (Unanimous) || 4 || 3:00
|-  style="text-align:center; background:#c5d2ea;"
| 2018-12-18|| No Contest ||align=left| Yuta Hayashi || K-1 World GP 2018: K-1 Lightweight World's Strongest Tournament || Osaka, Japan || Doctor Stoppage || 1 ||
|-  style="text-align:center; background:#CCFFCC;"
| 2018-08-18|| Win ||align=left| Kaito Yamawaki || Krush.92 ～in NAGOYA～ || Nagoya, Japan || Decision (Unanimous) || 3 || 3:00
|-  style="text-align:center; background:#CCFFCC;"
| 2018-06-30|| Win ||align=left| Takaya Ogura || Krush.89 || Tokyo, Japan || Decision (Majority) || 3 || 3:00
|-  style="text-align:center; background:#FFBBBB;"
| 2017-11-12|| Loss ||align=left| Ryo Takahashi || NJKF 2017 west 4th || Tokyo, Japan || Decision (Unanimous) || 3 || 3:00
|-  style="text-align:center; background:#CCFFCC;"
| 2017-09-24|| Win ||align=left| Kongbannaw Acegym || NJKF 2017 3rd || Tokyo, Japan || KO (Punches) || 2 || 2:07
|-  style="text-align:center; background:#CCFFCC;"
| 2017-06-18|| Win ||align=left| Koudai Kusaka || NJKF 2017 2nd || Tokyo, Japan || TKO (Corner Stoppage)|| 4 || 3:00
|-
! style=background:white colspan=9 |
|-  style="text-align:center; background:#CCFFCC;"
| 2017-02-05|| Win ||align=left| Hiroto Ichimura || NJKF 2017 west 1st || Tokyo, Japan || Decision (Unanimous) || 3 || 3:00
|-  style="text-align:center; background:#FFBBBB;"
| 2016-10-02|| Loss ||align=left| Yuki Kyotani || Hoot Cup Kings Osaka || Osaka, Japan || Decision (Unanimous)|| 3 || 3:00
|-  style="text-align:center; background:#CCFFCC;"
| 2016-06-26|| Win ||align=left| Ryota Ina || NJKF 2016 4th || Osaka, Japan || Decision (Unanimous) || 3 || 3:00
|-  style="text-align:center; background:#FFBBBB;"
| 2015-11-15|| Loss ||align=left| Moriya || NJKF 2015 6th || Tokyo, Japan || Ext.R Decision (Unanimous) || 4 || 3:00
|-  style="text-align:center; background:#CCFFCC;"
| 2015-04-05|| Win ||align=left| Choi Chong Bin || NJKF 2015 2nd || Tokyo, Japan || TKO || 2 || 0:47
|-  style="text-align:center; background:#FFBBBB;"
| 2014-12-21|| Loss ||align=left| Unao Hatomune || DEEP KICK 23 || Osaka, Japan || Decision (Unanimous)|| 3 || 3:00
|-  style="text-align:center; background:#CCFFCC;"
| 2014-11-02|| Win ||align=left| Tono || NJKF 2014 7th || Osaka, Japan || TKO (3 Knockdowns)|| 1 || 2:14
|-  style="text-align:center; background:#CCFFCC;"
| 2014-06-01|| Win ||align=left| Mitsuhito Ogura || NJKF 2014 4th || Osaka, Japan || Decision (Unanimous)|| 3 || 3:00
|-  style="text-align:center; background:#CCFFCC;"
| 2014-03-09|| Win ||align=left| Kaori Yukinari || NJKF 2014 2nd || Osaka, Japan || KO (Left High Kick) || 1 || 1:32
|-  style="text-align:center; background:#CCFFCC;"
| 2013-12-08|| Win ||align=left| Kyosuke Nishida|| NJKF 2013 8th || Japan || Decision (Unanimous) || 3 || 3:00
|-  style="text-align:center; background:#CCFFCC;"
| 2013-09-15|| Win ||align=left| Hiroki Matsuoka|| NJKF 2013 5th || Osaka, Japan || Decision (Majority) || 3 || 2:00
|-
| colspan=9 | Legend:    

|-  style="background:#CCFFCC;"
| 2013-03-17|| Win ||align=left| Masahiko Suzuki || NJKF 2013 2nd || Osaka, Japan || Decision || 2 || 2:00
|-
| colspan=9 | Legend:

See also
 List of male kickboxers

References

Living people
1996 births
Japanese male kickboxers
Sportspeople from Osaka